Attorney General Burt may refer to:

Septimus Burt (1847–1919), Attorney General of Western Australia
Sydney Burt (1826–1892), Attorney General of Fiji

See also
Adolphus W. Burtt (1832–1917), Attorney General of South Dakota